The UBC Okanagan Heat are the athletic teams that represent the University of British Columbia Okanagan in Kelowna, British Columbia and currently compete in the Canada West conference of U Sports. The Heat field varsity teams in basketball, cross country, golf, soccer, and volleyball.

History
The Heat received probationary membership in Canada West in 2010 and had the men's and women's volleyball and men's and women's basketball teams begin competition there in the 2011–2012 season. The program was granted full membership in 2013 and the men's and women's soccer programs began competing in the 2014–2015 season. Since the Heat's entry into Canada West, the women's volleyball team has largely been the most successful after qualifying for the playoffs six times and earning two berths in the U Sports national tournament.

Men's basketball
The UBCO men's basketball team won its first ever men's basketball conference game on November 25, 2011, when they defeated the Regina Cougars 78-76 during their inaugural 2011-12 Canada West season. The team did not qualify for the playoffs that year and did not qualify for the post season for the first nine years of their Canada West membership.

Women's basketball
The UBCO women's basketball team first began play in Canada West in the 2011–2012 season and finished outside of the playoffs with a 2–16 record. The team has not yet qualified for the Canada West playoffs as of the 2019–2020 season.

Men's volleyball
The UBCO men's volleyball team made the post-season in their first season in Canada West during the 2011–2012 season and were the only Heat team to qualify for the playoffs in that inaugural year. Remarkably, as of the 2019–2020 season, that was the only year that the team has qualified for the playoffs in Canada West.

Women's volleyball
The UBCO women's volleyball team first began competing in Canada West in the 2011–2012 season and finished out of the playoffs with a 6–14 record. However, the team rapidly improved the following year where they finished with a 15–7 record and a third place conference finish where they lost to the Mount Royal Cougars in their first Canada West playoff appearance. While the team regressed to a 12–10 record and a seventh-place finish in the 2013–2014 season, the Heat claimed their first post-season series victory against the Brandon Bobcats before ultimately losing the Canada West Bronze Medal match to the Trinity Western Spartans. The team finished third in the regular season in 2014–2015, but once again fell short in the playoffs, losing the bronze medal game to the UBC Thunderbirds.

For the 2015–2016 season, the Heat finished in first place in the Canada West conference regular season with a 22–2 record and subsequently hosted the Canada West Final Four. After defeating the Thunderbirds in the semi-final, the Heat lost a five-set match to the Spartans in the Canada West Championship game. However, because the Heat finished in the top three in the Canada West playoffs, the team qualified for their first U Sports women's volleyball championship tournament and were the third-seeded team. After defeating the Dalhousie Tigers in the quarter-finals, the Heat lost in the Semi-Finals to the eventual champion Toronto Varsity Blues. However, in the bronze medal match, the Heat once again defeated the UBC Thunderbirds to claim third place in their first ever appearance in the CIS national tournament.

The Heat finished with a 15–9 record and a fifth-place finish for the 2016–2017 season but lost the Bronze Medal match in the Canada West playoffs to the Trinity Western Spartans. In 2017–2018, the team finished in third place with a 19–5 record but lost in the Canada West semi-finals to the Thunderbirds. However, since the 2017 national championship tournament qualified four Canada West teams, no bronze medal game was played and the Heat automatically qualified for the eight-team tournament. However, the fifth-seeded Heat lost to the fourth-seeded, and eventual champion, Ryerson Rams after giving up a 2-0 set lead.

The 2018–2019 season saw the Heat tumble down the standings with a 2-22 last-place finish and an absence from the playoffs for the first time since their inaugural season in Canada West. The following 2019-2020 season was an improvement with a 7-17 finish, but the team still finished in tenth place and out of the playoffs.

Awards and honors

Athletes of the Year
The female athlete of the year is awarded the Bakewell Trophy while the Wilson Challenge Trophy is presented to the male athlete of the year.

References

External links
 

U Sports teams
Sport in Kelowna